Jaime Monjo (born: 3 August 1953) is a sailor from Palma de Mallorca, Spain. who represented his country at the 1988 Summer Olympics in Busan, South Korea as crew member in the Soling. With helmsman Antonio Gorostegui and fellow crew members José Manuel Valades and Domingo Manrique they took the 17th place.

References

Living people
1953 births
Sailors at the 1988 Summer Olympics – Soling
Olympic sailors of Spain
Spanish male sailors (sport)